Stadttheater Passau is a theatre in Passau, Bavaria, Germany.

Theatres in Bavaria